The Murder of Princess Diana is a bestselling 2004 book by British journalist Noel Botham. Botham's book disputes the official account that the death of Diana, Princess of Wales was an accident.

The publisher claims the book "firmly lays to rest the theory that Diana's death was mere accident, and finally gives the people of Britain the explanation they deserve." The book was reissued for the 20th anniversary of Diana's death in 2017.

Background and synopsis
Botham, a newspaper journalist, attempts to put forward an alternative version of the events surrounding Diana's death, reportedly citing intelligence and royal sources. Botham alleges that Diana was, as she herself predicted, the "victim of a professional hit squad".

Reception
A fictionalised television adaption of the book, The Murder of Princess Diana was released in 2007.

References

2004 non-fiction books
Books about conspiracy theories
Books about Diana, Princess of Wales
Books about intelligence agencies
Non-fiction crime books
Non-fiction books adapted into films
Pinnacle Books books